The 2019 Russian Women's Curling Championship was held in Sochi from April 6 to 13, 2019.

Teams

Round Robin

Playoffs

Quarterfinals. April 12, 10:30

1st vs 2nd

3rd vs 4th

Semifinal. April 12, 18:00

Bronze Medal Match. April 13, 12:30

Gold Medal Match. April 13, 12:30

Final standings

References

External links
 Чемпионат России по кёрлингу среди женских команд 2019 — Керлинг в России
 Video:

See also
2019 Russian Men's Curling Championship
2019 Russian Mixed Curling Championship
2019 Russian Mixed Doubles Curling Championship
2019 Russian Junior Curling Championships
2019 Russian Wheelchair Curling Championship

Curling competitions in Russia
Russian Women's Curling Championship
Russian Women's Curling Championship
Curling Women's Championship
Russian Women's Curling Championship
Sports competitions in Sochi